KWCA (101.1 FM) is a radio station licensed to Palo Cedro, California. The station is owned by the Southern Oregon University, and is an affiliate of Jefferson Public Radio, airing JPR's "Classics & News" service, consisting of news and classical music programming.

Previous logo

External links

WCA (FM)
Southern Oregon University